Careless is the surname of:

 Betty Careless (c. 1704–1739), notorious courtesan and bagnio owner in London
 George Careless (1839–1932),  Latter-day Saint composer and conductor
 J. M. S. Careless (1919–2009), Canadian historian from the University of Toronto
 William Careless, later known as William Carlos (c. 1610–1689), companion of King Charles II in his hiding in an oak tree in the English Civil War

See also
Carless, another surname